The Rho GTPase activating protein 31 is encoded in humans by the ARHGAP31 gene. It is a Cdc42/Rac1 GTPase regulator.

Function 

ARHGAP31 encodes a GTPase-activating protein (GAP). A variety of cellular processes are regulated by Rho GTPases which cycle between an inactive form bound to GDP and an active form bound to GTP. This cycling between inactive and active forms is regulated by guanine nucleotide exchange factors and GAPs. The encoded protein is a GAP shown to regulate two GTPases involved in protein trafficking and cell growth.

Clinical relevance 
ARHGAP31 mutations result in a loss of available active Cdc42 and consequently disrupt actin cytoskeletal structures, causing syndromic cutis aplasia and limb anomalies.

References

External links

Further reading

Proteins